Israel participated in the 1974 Asian Games held in Tehran, Iran from 1 September 1974 to 16 September 1974. This was the last appearance of Israel in Asian Games. Athletes from Israel won overall 19 medals, including seven gold, and finished sixth in a medal table.

In this Games, athletes from the Arab nations, Pakistan, China and North Korea refused to play with Israel in tennis, fencing, basketball and football events, due to political reasons.

Expulsion after the Games
Two years after the Games, Asian Games Federation barred Israel from participating in the 1978 Asian Games. In July 1976 the 25 members of the Asian Games Federation were canvassed to see if Israel should participate in the 1978 Games, with all 12 responses received voting against including Israel.

Medals

Athletics

Men

Women

Basketball

Preliminary round - group B

Standings

Games

Second Round - group B

Standings

Games

Final round

Bracket

Semi-finals

Finals

Roster
Coach: Abraham Hemo
 Motti Aroesti
 Shamuel Avishar
 Miki Berkovich
 Tal Brody
 Jacob Eisner
 Hanan Keren
 Itamar Marzel
 Avigdor Moskowitz
 Shamuel Nachmias
 Shuki Schwartz
 Boaz Yanai
 Shmaryahu Zaslevsky

Fencing

Women

Football

Preliminary round - group C

Standings

Matches

Second round - group B

Standings

Matches

Finals

Shooting

Air pistol

Free pistol

Air rifle

Small bore rifle prone

Small bore rifle 3 positions

Small bore standard rifle 3 positions

Swimming

Medal summary

Men

Men's results

100 m freestyle

Heats

Final

200 m freestyle

Heats

Final

400 m freestyle

Heats

100 m butterfly

Heats

Final

200 m butterfly

Heats

Final

200 m individual medley

Heats

Women

100 m breaststroke

Heats

Final

200 m breaststroke

Heats

Final

200 m individual medley

Heats

Final

Tennis

Medalists

Weightlifting

Medal summary

Medalists

Results

82.5 kg

90 kg

110 kg

References

Nations at the 1974 Asian Games
1974
Asian Games